House of Wittelsbach is a former German dynasty.

Wittelsbach may also refer to:

 
 
 Burg Wittelsbach, a castle near Aichach, Germamy
 90712 Wittelsbach

See also